Ryhill Halt railway station in Ryhill, West Yorkshire, England was a small railway halt on the Dearne Valley Junction Railway, a branch of the Lancashire and Yorkshire Railway which connected it to the Dearne Valley Railway. It was situated between Wakefield Kirkgate and Grimethorpe. It was opened for passenger traffic on 3 June 1912 and closed, along with others on the line on 10 September 1951.

Another station, Ryhill, served the village on the GCR's Barnsley Coal Railway from 1882 to 1930, about half a mile to the north west.

References

External links 
 Ryhill station on navigable 1955 O. S. map

Disused railway stations in Wakefield
Former Lancashire and Yorkshire Railway stations
Railway stations in Great Britain opened in 1912
Railway stations in Great Britain closed in 1951
1912 establishments in England